Coralie Lansdowne Says No is a play by Alex Buzo about a woman's struggle for independence.

Plot
Coralie is an independent woman who refuses to settle down to one man. When she stays at an ex lover's beach house, a series of visitors make her re-think her place in the world.

Production History
The play was first produced by the Nimrod Theatre in 1974 as part of the Adelaide Festival of the Arts.

1980 TV adaptation

The play was filmed by the ABC in 1980 as the first part of the Australian Theatre Festival.

Producer Alan Burke says Buzo changed his own play significantly but was very happy with the result saying it better represented what he wanted to write.

Cast
Wendy Hughes as Coralie Landsdowne
David Waters as Stuart
Brian Blain as Peter
Robert Coleby as Paul
Elaine Mangan as Anne
Mary-Lou Stewart as Jill
Basil Clarke as Dr. Salmon

Reception
The Sydney Morning Herald TV critic called it "a TV flop".

References

External links

TV adaptation at Screen Australia

1974 plays
Australian plays adapted into films